The 2009–10 Georgia Tech Yellow Jackets men's basketball team represented Georgia Institute of Technology  in the 2009–10 college basketball season. This was Paul Hewitt's tenth season as head coach. The Yellow Jackets compete in the Atlantic Coast Conference and played their home games at Alexander Memorial Coliseum. They finished the season 23–13, 7–9 in ACC play. They advanced to the championship game of the 2010 ACC men's basketball tournament as the 7 seed before losing to regular season champion Duke. They received an at–large bid to the 2010 NCAA Division I men's basketball tournament, earning a 10 seed in the Midwest Region. They upset 7 seed Oklahoma State in the first round before falling to 2 seed and AP #5 Ohio State in the second round.

Pre-season
On Thursday, September 24, it was announced that the Georgia Tech Men's basketball team had cancelled their trip to Canada, which was to take place the weekend of October 2–5, due to concerns over NCAA regulations. The issue revolved around NCAA rules prohibiting teams from taking trips within 30 days of the official start of pre-season practice. The trip did fall within Georgia Tech's fall break from classes. NCAA regulations allow teams to take an international trip once every four years, but the trip must occur before the 30-day period leading up to the official start of pre-season practice, which this year is October 16. Georgia Tech had asked for and received a waiver from the NCAA, but ultimately decided against taking the fall break trip amid concerns over the regulations.

Roster

Schedule

|-
!colspan=9 style=| Exhibition

|-
!colspan=9 style=| Regular Season

 

|-
!colspan=9 style=| ACC tournament

|-
!colspan=9 style=| NCAA tournament

Rankings

*AP does not release post-NCAA Tournament rankings^Coaches did not release a Week 2 poll.

References

Georgia Tech Yellow Jackets men's basketball seasons
Georgia Tech
Georgia Tech
Georgia Tech Yellow Jackets men's basketball team
Georgia Tech Yellow Jackets men's basketball team